Karow is a village and a former municipality  in the Ludwigslust-Parchim district, in Mecklenburg-Vorpommern, Germany. Since 1 January 2011, it is part of the town Plau am See.

References

Villages in Mecklenburg-Western Pomerania